Phorcus lineatus, common name the lined top shell, is a species of sea snail, a marine gastropod mollusk in the family Trochidae, the top snails. It is native to shores of the eastern North Atlantic Ocean.

Description
The size of the shell varies between 10 mm and 35 mm. The very thick and solid imperforate shell is subperforate in the young. It has a globose-conic shape. It is dull grayish, densely marked all over with very numerous fine flexuous or zigzag braided purplish-black lines. The spire is conic. The 6 to 7 whorls are convex. The apex is usually eroded and orange-colored. The body whorl is flattened around the superior portion. The base of the shell is eroded in front of the aperture. The aperture is oblique. The columella is short, obtusely subdentate near the base, spreading at the insertion into a heavy callous, which covers the umbilicus.

This species is similar to Phorcus turbinatus  in form, but usually has the outlines of the spire more convex. The columella projection or tooth is nearer the base than in the Phorcus turbinatus, and the diverse color patterns will serve to further distinguish the two species.

Distribution
This species occurs in the following locations:
 European waters (ERMS scope)
 Portuguese Exclusive Economic Zone
 Spanish Exclusive Economic Zone
 United Kingdom Exclusive Economic Zone
 Wimereux
 Atlantic Ocean off Mauritania.

References

External links
 To World Register of Marine Species
 

lineatus
Gastropods described in 1778
Gastropods of Africa
Gastropods of Europe
Taxa named by Emanuel Mendes da Costa